Mavis Ogun  (born 24 August 1973) is a Nigerian footballer who played as a defender for the Nigeria women's national football team. She was part of the team at the 1991 FIFA Women's World Cup, 1995 FIFA Women's World Cup and 1999 FIFA Women's World Cup.

References

External links
 

1973 births
Living people
Nigerian women's footballers
Nigeria women's international footballers
Place of birth missing (living people)
1991 FIFA Women's World Cup players
1995 FIFA Women's World Cup players
1999 FIFA Women's World Cup players
Women's association football defenders
 Yoruba people